"All Night" is a song by dance-pop and freestyle singer Trinere and the second single released from the album Trinere in 1985. It reached number 68 on the U.S. R&B chart.

Track listing
 12" single

Charts

References

1985 singles
Trinere songs
1985 songs
Song articles with missing songwriters